Phytoecia cylindrica is a species of beetle in the family Cerambycidae. It was described by Carl Linnaeus in 1758. It has a wide distribution throughout Europe. It feeds on Daucus carota, Laserpitium siler, Astrantia major, Anthriscus sylvestris, Heracleum sphondylium.

References

Phytoecia
Beetles described in 1758
Taxa named by Carl Linnaeus